Humme is a river of Lower Saxony, Germany. Its source is at the border of North Rhine-Westphalia. It flows into the Weser near Hameln.

See also
List of rivers of Lower Saxony

References

Rivers of Lower Saxony
Rivers of Germany